Wheatus is the debut studio album by American rock band Wheatus, released by Columbia Records on August 15, 2000. Written mostly by guitarist and vocalist Brendan B. Brown, it was recorded in the basement of Brown's mother's house, and self-produced by the band with the help of multiple mixing engineers and George Marino as mastering engineer.

In July 2000, "Teenage Dirtbag" was released as the album's first single, and peaked at number 7 on the Billboard Alternative Airplay Chart and number 2 on the UK Singles Chart.  "A Little Respect", an Erasure cover, was released as the second single in July 2001. "Wannabe Gangstar"/"Leroy", a double A-side single, was released in January 2002 as the final single.

Background
Wheatus formed in 1995 after guitarist and vocalist Brendan B. Brown left the skate-pop band Mr. Jones to write his own material. Brown brought in his younger brother, Peter, to play drums and Rich Liegey to play bass. Peter enjoyed the songs Brendan had written. Multi-instrumentalist and engineer Phil A. Jimenez wanted to work with Brown after hearing "Teenage Dirtbag". The following week, Jimenez was at band rehearsal, appreciating every song. The energy "of the pop elements" in addition to "the story-telling and the social commentary" made Jimenez feel like he "really wanted to be a part of [the band]."

Composition
All of the material on Wheatus was written by Brendan B. Brown, except for "Punk Ass Bitch", which was written by bassist Rich Liegey, and their cover of Erasure's "A Little Respect", which was written by Vince Clarke and Andy Bell. The song titles came to Brown first with the subject matter following as he considered the name "an emotional blueprint". Brown mentioned that the beat in "Teenage Dirtbag" was "sort of a hip-hop thing" and that the guitars "are definitely heavy metal". Brown had the chorus melody and the "oh yeah" section before finishing the song's lyrics, it was "one of those once-in-a-lifetime melodies that works for every reason." Brown claimed the song was autobiographical, however, none of the band members "wound up getting the girl in the end. So I guess that's the inspiration—the hope that that happens to someone someday."

Talking about "Truffles" and "Wannabe Gangstar", Brown explained that when you're younger "You can't do anything [...]. You have no power; you have no resources. You're subject to everyone else's crap". "Sunshine", the first song written for the album, was Brown realizing he was working for the wrong kind of people. "Hump'Em N' Dump'Em" was written when the Senate was thinking of impeaching the president. "Hey, Mr. Brown" was written after Brown was not being paid for something he had done. "Love Is a Mutt from Hell" was about a dysfunctional romance. "Wannabe Gangster" was inspired by "white, middle class glorification of inner city problems", according to Brown.

Recording
Using the knowledge he gained from being in his former band, Wheatus was recorded in the basement of Brown's mother's house. A control room was set up in the dining room, with a one hundred-foot cable leading down to the basement. Wheatus was produced and engineered by Wheatus and Philip A. Jimenez. One of the reasons the band self-produced the album was their idea to take specific sounds from different genres and include them into songs. Brown explained that "When you're a small band and nothing's going on for you, you can't explain to somebody bigger than you [...] what you want to do. They just won't care." New York-based band Soul Coughing had a big influence on the production of the album.

Despite the multitude of electric guitar tones, no electric guitars were used in the recording process. The tones originate from Brown's acoustic Martin guitar, which is set up through two preamplifiers which are connected to their own power amplifiers. Brown can swap between the preamplifiers with the aid of an expression pedal so that he is able to "swell into a distortion sound while fading out the clean tone". Brown claimed he does not know "[that] many guitar players", thus he took three different guitar sounds that he enjoyed and merged them into his sound. Jimenez provided percussion, harmonica and banjo. David Thoener mixed almost all of the tracks apart from "Wannabe Gangstar", which was mixed by Brown, and "A Little Respect", which was mixed by Richard A. LaSalvia. The album was mastered by George Marino at Sterling Sound in New York.

Release
Wheatus was named artist of week at billboardtalentnet.com in February 2000. In March, Wheatus signed to Columbia. Liegey left the band prior to the release of Wheatus and was replaced by Mike McCabe in July, who left his job as a flight attendant to join the band. "Teenage Dirtbag" was released as a single on July 18. The music video, directed by Jeff Gordon, was nominated for Best Video at the Kerrang! Awards. The song was given extra promotion due to its inclusion on the soundtrack to the film Loser (2000). According to an issue of Billboard dated July 2000 Wheatus was the most-download artist at billboardtalentnet.com. In the same issue, it mentioned that the band's debut album was planned to be called Teenage Dirtbag and was set for release on August 1. Instead, Wheatus was released through Columbia on August 15. In September, the band toured the US.

Wheatus toured the UK in April 2001. "A Little Respect" was released as a single on July 2. The music video, directed by Brendan Malloy, is about how a boyfriend fails to impress his girlfriend until Wheatus stages a private concert for the pair. It features Shawn Hatosy and Brittany Murphy. Wheatus tour the UK again in November and December 2001. A double A-side single of "Wannabe Gangstar" and "Leroy" was released on January 22, 2002. The music video for "Wannabe Gangstar" was directed by Gordon, while the video for "Leroy" was directed by Mark Hartley. A remixed version of "Wannabe Ganstar" featuring Iron Maiden vocalist Bruce Dickinson was released earlier on January 7. In March, Brown asked Shannon Harris to join the band as a keyboardist. Tired of being a session musician, Harris accepted. Harris moved to New York and lived with Brown. The band toured the UK in June.

Reception and legacy

"Teenage Dirtbag" reached number two on the UK Singles Chart and number seven on the US Alternative Songs chart. Wheatus charted at number 76 in the US and number seven in the UK. In February 2001, the "Teenage Dirtbag" single was certified silver in the UK and in the following month it was certified gold. The album was certified silver in the UK in April 2001. The following month, it was certified gold in the UK. "A Little Respect" peaked at number 3 in the UK. By August, the album had sold one million copies worldwide. "Wannabe Gangstar"/"Leroy" peaked at number 22 in the UK.

In July 2013, the album was certified platinum in the UK, as was the "Teenage Dirtbag" single. The single is also certified three times platinum in Australia. In July 2014, the "A Little Respect" single was certified silver. By August 2015, the album had sold over five million copies worldwide. Discussing the album's legacy, Brown revealed that the recognition "did not initially happen in America. At home we were a bit under the radar. Most people at the label didn't really understand how we fitted, or didn't fit, into what was happening in music at the time." The band played the album in full in the UK in September and October with support from Mike Doughty and The Hipstones.

Track listing
All songs written by Brendan Brown, except where noted.

 "I'd Never Write a Song About You" – 3:38
 "Pretty Girl" – 4:29
 "Hey, Mr. Brown" (with Club Audience) – 2:22
 "Sunshine" (remix) – 2:52
 "A Little Respect" (David Thoener mix #1) – 3:25
 "Teenage Dirtbag" (live at the Chapel) – 4:43
 "Leroy" (live at the Chapel) – 3:40
 "Wannabe Gangstar" (live at the Chapel) – 4:01
 "Truffles" (live at the Chapel) – 3:51
 "Sunshine" (X-ecutioners remix) – 2:52
 "Pretty Girl" (live at the Chapel) – 5:01
 "Wannabe Gangstar" (Soulchild radio remix)
 "Wannabe Gangstar" (featuring Bruce Dickinson)
 "Leroy" (Brendan's mix) 
 "Leroy" (live from V festival, 2001)
 "Hey, Mr. Brown" (live from V festival, 2001)
 "Pretty Girl" (Virgin radio acoustic version)
 "Hey, Mr. Brown" (live in Australia) – 2:11
 "Leroy" (edit) – 3:05

Personnel
Personnel per booklet.

Wheatus
 Brendan B. Brown – vocals, guitar
 Rich Liegey – vocals, bass guitar
 Peter Brown – drums, backing vocals, additional percussion
 Philip A. Jimenez – percussion, keyboards, harmonica, banjo

Additional musician
 Pippi Longscratchings – scratching on "Teenage Dirtbag"

Production
 Wheatus – producer, engineer
 David Thoener – mixing (except "Wannabe Gangstar" and "A Little Respect")
 Brendan B. Brown – mixing on "Wannabe Gangstar"
 Richard A. LaSalvia – mixing on "A Little Respect"
 George Marino – mastering
 Gary Montalvo – art direction, design
 Gail Marowitz – art direction
 Raphael Fuchs – photographs
 Jeffrey Bender – photographs

Charts

Weekly charts

Year-end charts

Certifications

References
Footnotes

Citations

Sources

External links

Wheatus at YouTube (streamed copy where licensed)

2000 debut albums
Albums recorded in a home studio
Columbia Records albums
Wheatus albums